In comic books (primarily American comic books), a limited series is a title given to a comic book series that is intended from the outset to have a finite length.

Each list is defined by publisher and the length by which each series ran.  For the purposes of the lists, a limited series is defined as being one for which the publisher had announced the final issue number prior to or on the publication of the first issue.

Two to three issues

Published by DC Comics
Adam Strange, 1990 (3 issues)
Armageddon 2001, 1991 (2 issues)
Batman: The Dark Knight Strikes Again, 2001-2002 (3 issues)
Batman: Gotham County Line, 2005 (3 issues)
Batman/Lobo, 2007 (2 issues)
Batman: Outlaws, 2000 (3 issues)
Batman: Run, Riddler, Run, 1992 (3 issues)
Batman: Tenses, 2003 (2 issues)
Batman: Two-Face Strikes Twice, 1993 (2 issues)
Batman/Wildcat, 1997 (3 issues)
Blackhawk, 1988 (3 issues)
Black Orchid, 1988-1989 (3 issues)
Bugs Bunny, 1990 (3 issues)
Bugs Bunny Monthly, 1994 (3 issues)
Captain Carrot and His Amazing Zoo-Crew: The Oz-Wonderland War, 1986 (3 issues)
Captain Carrot and the Final Ark, 2007 (3 issues)
Clash, 1991 (3 issues)
Convergence: Crime Syndicate, 2015 (2 issues)
Convergence: Green Lantern / Parallax, 2015 (2 issues)
Convergence: Green Lantern Corps, 2015 (2 issues)
Convergence: Harley Quinn, 2015 (2 issues)
Convergence: The Flash, 2015 (2 issues)
Convergence: The Question, 2015 (2 issues)
Deadman: Love After Death, 1989-1990 (2 issues)
Deadman: Dark Mansion of Forbidden Love, 2017 (3 issues)
Doctor Mid-Nite, 1999 (3 issues) 
Green Arrow: The Longbow Hunters, 1987 (3 issues)
Green Lantern/Green Arrow, 1983 (3 issues, reprinting 6 classic GL Issues from 1970)
Green Lantern/Sentinel: Heart of Darkness, 1998 (3 issues)
Green Lantern: Circle of Fire, 2000 (2 issues)
Green Lantern: Dragon Lord, 2001 (3 issues)
Guy Gardner: Reborn, 1992 (3 issues)
Hawkworld, DC Comics, 1989 (3 issues)
History of the DC Universe, 1986 (2 issues)
The Immortal Dr. Fate, 1985 (3 issues) 
Invasion!, 1988-1989 (3 issues)
JLA-Z, 2003 - 2004 (3 issues)
JLA/Hitman, 2007 (2 issues)
Justice, Inc., 1989 (2 issues)
Kid Eternity, 1991 (3 issues)
The Kingdom, 1999 (2 issues)
Superman Presents: Krypton Chronicles, 1981 (3 issues)
Legends of the Worlds Finest, 1994 (3 issues)
Lois Lane, 1986 (2 issues)
Martian Manhunter: American Secrets, 1992 (3 issues) 
Masters of the Universe, 1982-1983 (3 issues)
¡Mucha Lucha!, 2003 (3 issues)
The Multiversity, 2014-2015 (2 issues)
Power Lords, 1983-1984 (3 issues)
Robin 3000, 1993 (2 issues)
Robotech Defenders, 1985 (2 issues)
Sebastian O, 1993 (3 issues)
Secrets of the Legion of Super-Heroes, 1981 (3 issues)
Skull & Bones, 1992 (3 issues)
Streets, 1993 (3 issues)
Tales of the Green Lantern Corps, 1981 (3 issues)
Trinity (also Batman-Superman-Wonder Woman: Trinity), 2004 (3 issues)
Twilight, 1990-1991 (3 issues)
The Untold Legend of the Batman, 1980 (3 issues)
Who's Who in Star Trek, 1987 (2 issues)
World of Krypton, 1979 (3 issues)
World's Finest, 1990 (3 issues)
Year One: Batman/Ra's Al Ghul, 2005 (2 issues)
Year One: Batman/Scarecrow, 2005 (2 issues)

Black Label imprint
Batman: Damned, 2018 (3 issues)

Elseworlds titles
Batgirl and Robin: Thrillkiller, (3 issues)
Batman: The Book of the Dead, 1999 (2 issues)
Batman: League of Batmen, 2001 (2 issues)
Batman: Dark Knight of the Round Table, 1998 (2 issues)
Batman: The Doom That Came to Gotham, 2000 (3 issues)
Batman: Hollywood Knight, 2001 (3 issues)
Batman: Manbat, 1995 (3 issues)
Catwoman: Guardian of Gotham, 1999 (2 issues)
Conjurors (3 issues)
Elseworld's Finest
Flashpoint, 1999 (3 issues)
Green Lantern: Evil's Might, 2002 (3 issues)
Justice League: Act of God, 2000-2001 (3 issues)
JLA: Age Of Wonder, 2003 (2 issues)
JLA: Created Equal, 2000 (2 issues)
JLA: The Nail, 1998 (3 issues)
JLA: Another Nail, 2004 (3 issues)
JLA: The Secret Society of Super-Heroes, 2000 (2 issues)
League of Justice, 1996 (2 issues)
Robin 3000, 1992 (2 issues)
Superman: Last Son of Earth, 2000 (2 issues)
Superman: Red Son, 2003 (3 issues)
Superman/Tarzan: Sons of the Jungle, 2001 (3 issues)

Johnny DC imprint
Hi Hi Puffy Amiyumi, 2006 (3 issues)

Vertigo imprint
Adventures in the Rifle Brigade, DC Comics (Vertigo), 2000 (3 issues)
Adventures in the Rifle Brigade: Operation Bollock, DC Comics (Vertigo), 2001 (3 issues)
Jonah Hex: Shadows West, DC Comics (Vertigo), 1999 (3 issues)

Published by Image Comics
Angela, Image Comics, 1994-1995 (3 issues)
City of Silence, Image Comics, 2000 (3 issues)
Mayhem!, Image Comics, 2009 (3 issues)
Ministry of Space, Image Comics, 2001 (3 issues)
Pretty, Baby, Machine, Image Comics, 2008 (3 issues)
Splitting Image, Image Comics, 1993 (2 issues)
Ward of the State, Image Comics, 2007 (3 issues)

Published by Marvel Comics
Abominations, Marvel Comics, 1996 (3 issues)
Avataars: Covenant of the Shield, Marvel Comics, 2000 (3 issues)
Beast, Marvel Comics, 1997 (3 issues)
Before the Fantastic Four: Reed Richards, Marvel Comics, 2000 (3 issues)
Beta Ray Bill: Godhunter, Marvel Comics, 2009 (3 issues) 
Blood and Glory, Marvel Comics, 1992 (3 issues)
Contest of Champions, Marvel Comics Group, 1982 (3 issues)
Daily Bugle, Marvel Comics 1996-1997 (3 issues)
Daredevil: Ninja, Marvel Comics, 2000-2001 (3 issues)
Dark Reign: Lethal Legion, Marvel Comics, 2009 (3 issues)
Dark Reign: Mr. Negative, Marvel Comics 2009 (3 issues)
Machine Man 2020, Marvel Comics, 1994 (2 issues)
The Punisher: Origin of Microchip, Marvel Comics, 1993 (2 issues)
The Punisher: Ghost of Innocents, Marvel Comics, 1993 (2 issues)
Red Sonja, Marvel Comics, 1983 (2 issues)
Red Sonja, Marvel Comics, 1985 (2 issues)
Secret Invasion: Amazing Spider-Man Marvel Comics, 2008 (3 issues)
Secret Invasion: Fantastic Four Marvel Comics, 2008 (3 issues)
Secret Invasion: Runaways/Young Avengers, Marvel Comics, 2008 (3 issues)
Secret Invasion: Thor, Marvel Comics, 2008 (3 issues)
Spider-Man: Death & Destiny Marvel Comics, 2000 (3 issues)
Spider-Man: Funeral For an Octopus Marvel Comics, 1995 (3 issues)
Spider-Man: Hobgoblin Lives Marvel Comics, 1997 (3 issues)
Spider-Man: Lifeline Marvel Comics, 2001 (3 issues)
Spider-Man: Revenge of the Green Goblin Marvel Comics, 2000 (3 issues)
Spider-Man: Shadow Games Marvel Comics, 1994 (3 issues)
Spider-Man: The Mysterio Manifesto Marvel Comics, 2001 (3 issues)
Spider-Man/The Punisher: Family Plot, Marvel Comics, 1996 (2 issues)
Spider-Man: The Lost Years, Marvel Comics, 1995 (3 issues)
Spider-Man: Web of Doom, Marvel Comics, 1994 (3 issues)
The Thanos Quest, Marvel Comics, 1990 (2 issues)
Wolverine: Days of Future Past, Marvel Comics, 1997-98 (3 issues)
Wolverine/Punisher: Damaging Evidence, Marvel Comics, 1993 (3 issues)
Wolverine/Black Cat: Claws, Marvel Comics, 2006 (3 issues)
World War Hulks: Spider-Man Vs. Thor, Marvel Comics, 2010 (2 issues)
X-Men: Curse of the Mutants - X-Men Vs. Vampires, Marvel Comics 2010 (2 issues)

Ultimate imprint
Ultimate X4, Marvel Comics, 2005–2006 (2 issues)

Other publishers
April O'Neil, Archie Comics, 1993 (3 issues)
April O'Neil: The May East Saga, Archie Comics, 1993 (3 issues)
Batman versus Predator, DC Comics and Dark Horse Comics, 1991-1992 (3 issues)
Darkwing Duck Limited Series (Disney Comics)
Dinosaurs, Disney Comics, 1993 (2 issues)
Donatello and Leatherhead, Archie Comics, 1993 (3 issues)
Futurama/Simpsons Special Infinitely Secret Crossover Crisis, Bongo Comics, 2002 (2 issues)
Princess Sally, Archie Comics, 1995 (3 issues)
Tale Spin Limited Series (Disney Comics) 
The Junior Woodchucks (Disney Comics) 
The Little Mermaid (Disney Comics) 
The New Adventures of Beauty and The Beast (Disney Comics) 
The Return of Aladdin, Disney Comics, 1993 (2 issues)
Serenity: Those Left Behind, Dark Horse Comics, 2005 (3 issues)
Shrek, Dark Horse Comics, 2003 (3 issues)
The Simpsons/Futurama Crossover Crisis II, Bongo Comics, 2005 (2 issues)
Sonic's Friendly Nemesis Knuckles, Archie Comics, 1996 (3 issues)
Sonic Quest: The Death Egg Saga, Archie Comics, 1996 (3 issues)
Star Trek: Deep Space Nine Marquis, Malibu, 1995
Street Fighter, Malibu Comics, 1994 (3 issues)
Tails, Archie Comics, 1995 (3 issues)
Teenage Mutant Ninja Turtles Adventures, Archie Comics, 1988 (3 issues)
Teenage Mutant Ninja Turtles Adventures: The Year of the Turtle, Archie Comics, 1996 (3 issues)
Whiteout: Melt, Oni Press, 2001 (3 issues)

Four issues

Published by CrossGen Comics
Chimera, 2003

Published by DC Comics
A. Bizarro, 1999
Ambush Bug, 1985
Amethyst: The Legend Reborn, 1987-1988
America vs. the Justice Society, 1985
Angel and the Ape (vol. 2), 1991
Aquaman (vol. 2), 1986
Aquaman: Time and Tide, 1993
Armageddon: The Alien Agenda, 1991-1992
Armageddon: Inferno, 1992
Batman: The Dark Knight Returns, 1986
Batman: Black & White, 1996
Batman: Bane of the Demon, 1998
Batman: The Cult, 1988
Batman: The Dark Knight Strikes Again, 2001-2002
Batman: GCPD, 1996
Batman: Gordon of Gotham, 1998
Batman: Gordon's Law, 1996
Batman: Gotham Nights, 1992
Batman: Gotham Nights II, 1995
Batman: Sword of Azrael, 1992-1993
Batman: Year One, 1987 (limited series within the Batman ongoing series)
Batman: Year 100, 2006
Beast Boy, 1999
Black Canary (vol. 1), 1991-1992 
Black Canary (vol.. 3), 2007
Bloodpack, 1995
The Books of Magic, 1990-1991
Breathtaker, 1990
Catwoman, 1989
Centurions, 1987
Cinder & Ash, 1988
Congorilla, 1992-1993
Conqueror of the Barren Earth, 1985
Cosmic Boy, 1986-1987
Cosmic Odyssey, 1987
The Crimson Avenger, 1988
Danger Trail, 1993
Deadman (vol. 2), 1986
Deadshot, 1988
The Demon, 1987
Doc Savage, 1987
Doctor Fate, 1987
Elfquest: The Discovery, 2006
Elongated Man, 1992
Gilgamesh II, 1989
The Golden Age, 1993
Green Arrow, 1983
Green Arrow: The Wonder Year, 1993
Jack Cross, 2005-2006
Jonni Thunder, 1985
The Legend of Wonder Woman, 1986
Legionnaires 3, 1986
Lobo, 1990-1991
Lobo: On Contract on Gawd, 1994
Lobo: Death and Taxes, 1996-1997
MASK, 1985
Martian Manhunter, 1988
Metal Men, 1993-1994
Mister E, 1991
Nathaniel Dusk, 1984
Nathaniel Dusk II, 1985-1986
The Nazz, 1990-1991
Nightwing, 1995 (spawned the ongoing series)
Nightwing/Huntress, 1998
OMAC (vol. 2), 1991
Peacemaker, 1988
The Phantom, 1988
The Phantom Stranger, 1987
The Phantom Zone, 1982
Plastic Man, 1988-1989
Power Girl, 1988
The Prisoner, 1988-1989
Red Tornado (vol. 1), 1985
Ring of the Nibelung, 1989-1990
Robin II, 1991
Robin: Year One, 2001
The Saga of Ra's al Ghul, 1988
Scene of the Crime, 1999
The Shade, 1997
The Shadow, 1986
The Shadow War of Hawkman, 1985
Shazam!: The Monster Society of Evil, 2007
Shazam!: The New Beginning, 1987
Spiral Zone, 1988
Star Trek - The Modala Imperative, 1991
Star Trek: The Next Generation - Ill Wind, 1995–96
Supergirl, 1994
Superman & Batman: Generations, 1999
Superman & Batman: Generations II, 2003
Superman & Bugs Bunny, 2000
Superman For All Seasons, 1999
Superman: Secret Identity, 2004
Superman: The Secret Years, 1985
Superman/Shazam: First Thunder, 2005–2006
Sword of the Atom, 1983
Tales of The New Teen Titans, 1982
Tempus Fugitive, 1990-1991
Underworld, 1987-1988
War of the Gods, 1991
The Weird, 1988
Who's Who: Update '88, 1988
Wild Dog, 1987
The World of Krypton, 1987
The World of Metropolis, 1988
The World of Smallville, 1988
Wrath of the Spectre, 1988

Elseworlds imprint
Batman: Haunted Gotham, 1999–2000
The Golden Age, 1993
JLA: Destiny, 2002
Kingdom Come, 1996
Superman/Wonder Woman: Whom Gods Destroy, 1997

Vertigo imprint
Sandman Presents: Thessaly, Witch for Hire, DC Comics (Vertigo), 2004
Unknown Soldier (vol. 3), DC Comics (Vertigo), 1997

Wildstorm imprint
Danger Girl: Back in Black, 2005–2006
Red Sonja/Claw the Unconquered: Devil's Hands, 2006
Legend, 2005

Published by Image Comics
Drums, Image Comics, 2011 (4 issues)
Fearless, Image Comics, 2007 (4 issues)
Intimidators, Image Comics, 2005 (4 issues)
The Milkman Murders, Image Comics, 2004 (4 issues)
Occult Crimes Taskforce, Image Comics, 2006 (4 issues)
Pax Romana, Image Comics, 2007 (4 issues)
Point of Impact, Image Comics, 2012 (4 issues)
Spawn/WildC.A.T.S., Image Comics, 1996 (4 issues)
The Tenth, Image Comics, 1997 (4 issues)
Undying Love, Image Comics, 2011 (4 issues)
XXXombies, Image Comics, 2007 (4 issues)

Published by Marvel Comics
Age of Heroes, Marvel Comics, 2010
Annihilation: Nova, Marvel Comics, 2006
Annihilation: Ronan, Marvel Comics, 2006
Annihilation: Silver Surfer, Marvel Comics, 2006
Annihilation: Super-Skrull, Marvel Comics, 2006
Annihilation: Conquest - Quasar, Marvel Comics, 2007
Annihilation: Conquest - Starlord, Marvel Comics, 2007
Annihilation: Conquest - Wraith, Marvel Comics, 2007
Apache Skies, Marvel Comics, 2002
Avengers and Power Pack Assemble, Marvel Comics, 2006
Black Panther, Marvel, 1988
Blaze of Glory, Marvel Comics, 2000
Cloak and Dagger: The Light and the Darkness, Marvel Comics, 1983
Ultimate Daredevil and Elektra, 2002
Deadpool: Circle Chase, Marvel Comics, 1993
Elektra: Glimpse & Echo, 2002
Elektra Saga, Marvel Comics, 1983
Falcon, Marvel Comics, 1983
Fantastic Four vs. The X-Men, Marvel Comics, 1987
Fantastic Four/Iron Man, Marvel Comics, 2005–06
Felicia Hardy: The Black Cat, Marvel Comics, 1994
G.I. Joe and the Transformers, Marvel Comics, 1987
Hawkeye, Marvel Comics Group, 1983
Hercules: Prince Of Power, Marvel Comics Group, 1982
Hercules, Marvel Comics Group, 1983
Iceman, Marvel Comics, 1984
Infinity: Heist, Marvel Comics, 2013-2014
Iron Man: Bad Blood, Marvel Comics, 2000
Jack of Hearts, Marvel Comics, 1983-4
Machine Man, Marvel Comics, 1984–85
Magik (Illyana and Storm), Marvel Comics, 1983-1984
Magneto: Not a Hero, Marvel Comics, 2011-2012
Mary Jane, Marvel Comics, 2004
Mary Jane: Homecoming, Marvel Comics, 2005
Marvels, Marvel Comics, 1994
Nightcrawler, Marvel Comics, 1985
The Punisher: Born, Marvel Comics, 2003
The Punisher P.O.V, Marvel Comics, 1991
The Punisher: Year One, Marvel Comics, 1994
Rocket Raccoon, Marvel Comics, 1985
Saga of the Original Human Torch, Marvel Comics, 1990
Sabretooth, Marvel Comics, 1993
The Deadly Foes of Spider-Man, Marvel Comics, 1991
The Lethal Foes of Spider-Man, Marvel Comics, 1993
Spider-Man: The Final Adventure, Marvel Comics, 1995-1996
Spider-Man: Redemption, Marvel Comics, 1996
Spider-Man/Daredevil, Marvel Comics, 2001
Spider-Man: Quality of Life, Marvel Comics, 2002
Spider-Man: Doctor Octopus-Year One, Marvel Comics, 2004
Star Wars: Captain Phasma, Marvel Comics, 2017
Star Wars: Shattered Empire, Marvel Comics, 2015
Starriors, Marvel Comics, 1984–85
Venom: Separation Anxiety, Marvel Comics, 1994-1995
Vision And The Scarlet Witch, Marvel Comics Group, 1982
West Coast Avengers, Marvel Comics, 1984
Wolverine, Marvel Comics, 1982
X-Men vs. The Avengers, Marvel Comics, 1987
X-Terminators, Marvel Comics, 1988

Marvel Knights
The Punisher: Purgatory, Marvel Comics, 1998-1999
Spider-Man/Wolverine, Marvel Comics, 2003
Daredevil/Spider-Man, Marvel Comics, 2000

Ultimate imprint
Ultimate War, Marvel Comics, 2002-2003
Ultimate Secret, Marvel Comics, 2005

Other publishers
Aliens vs. Predator vs. the Terminator, Dark Horse Comics, 2000
Darkwing Duck, Disney Comics, 1991
Fort: Prophet of the Unexplained, Dark Horse Comics, 2002
Give Me Liberty, Dark Horse Comics, 1990
Junior Woodchucks, Disney Comics, 1991
The Little Mermaid, Disney Comics, 1992
Resident Alien, Dark Horse Comics, 2012
RoboCop vs. Terminator, Dark Horse Comics, 1992
Sonic the Hedgehog, Archie Comics, 1993
Spider-Man: India, Gotham Entertainment Group, 2004
Star Trek: Countdown, IDW, 2009
Star Trek: Deep Space Nine - N-Vector, WildStorm, 2000
Star Trek: Deep Space Nine - Hearts and Minds, Malibu, 1994
Star Trek: Divided We Fall, WildStorm, 2001
Star Trek: The Next Generation - Perchance to Dream, WildStorm, 2000
TaleSpin, Disney Comics, 1990–91
Terminator Vol. 1, Dark Horse Comics, 1990
Terminator Vol. 2, Dark Horse Comics, 1998
The Last of Us: American Dreams, Dark Horse Comics, 2013
Whiteout, Oni Press, 1998

Five to six issues

Published by CrossGen Comics
Mark of Charon, 2003 (5 Issues)
The Silken Ghost, 2003 (5 Issues)

Published by DC Comics
Aquaman (vol. 3), 1989
Arkham Asylum: Living Hell, DC Comics, 2003 (6 issues)
Bat Lash, DC Comics, 2008 (6 issues) 
Batman '66 meets Wonder Woman '77, DC Comics, 2017 (6 issues)
Batman: Dark Detective, DC Comics, 2005 (6 issues)
Batman: Jekyll and Hyde, DC Comics, 2005 (6 issues)
Batman: Orpheus Rising, DC Comics, 2001 (5 issues)
Batman: Secrets, DC Comics, 2006 (5 issues)
Batman: Turning Points, DC Comics, January 2001 (5 issues)
The Batman Adventures: The Lost Years, DC Comics, 1997-98 (5 issues)
Batman and the Mad Monk, DC Comics, 2006-2007 (6 issues)
Batman and the Monster Men, DC Comics, 2005–2006 (6 issues)
Batman-Huntress: Cry for Blood, DC Comics, 2000 (6 issues)
Best of the Brave and the Bold, DC Comics, 1988-1989 (6 issues)
The Brave and the Bold (vol. 2), DC Comics, 1991-1992 (6 issues)
The Butcher, DC Comics, 1990 (5 issues)
Catwoman: When in Rome, DC Comics, 2004-2005 (6 issues)
Connor Hawke: Dragon's Blood, DC Comics, 2006-2007 (6 issues)
The Creeper, DC Comics, 2006-2007 (6 issues)
Crisis Aftermath: The Battle for Blüdhaven, DC Comics, 2006 (6 Issues)
DC: The New Frontier, DC Comics, 2004 (6 issues)
Deadman (Vol. 5), DC Comics, 2018 (6 issues)
The Demon: Hell is Earth, DC Comics, 2018 (6 issues)
Fanboy, DC Comics, 1999 (6 issues) 
Flash/Green Lantern: The Brave and the Bold, DC Comics, 1999–2000 (6 issues)
Forever People (vol. 2), DC Comics, 1988 (6 issues)
Green Arrow: Year One, DC Comics, 2007 (6 issues)
Green Lantern: Emerald Dawn, DC Comics, 1989-1990 (6 issues)
Green Lantern: Emerald Dawn II - 90 Days, DC Comics, 1991 (6 issues)
Green Lantern: Lost Army, DC Comics, 2015-2016 (6 issues)
Green Lantern: Rebirth, DC Comics, 2004-2005 (6 issues)
Green Lantern Corps: Edge of Oblivion, DC Comics, 2016 (6 issues)
Green Lantern Corps: Recharge, DC Comics, 2005–2006 (5 issues)
The Griffin, DC Comics, 1991 (6 issues)
Harley Quinn & Her Gang of Harleys, DC Comics, 2016 (6 issues)
Harley Quinn & Power Girl, DC Comics, 2015-2016 (6 issues)
Harley's Little Black Book, DC Comics, 2016-2017 (6 issues)
Hawk and Dove (vol. 2), DC Comics, 1988-1989 (5 issues)
Hero Hotline, DC Comics, 1989 (6 issues)
Infinite Crisis tie-in limited series:
Day of Vengeance, DC Comics, 2005 (6 issues)
The OMAC Project, DC Comics, 2005 (6 issues)
Rann-Thanagar War, DC Comics, 2005 (6 issues)
Villains United, DC Comics, 2005 (6 issues)
Knight and Squire, DC Comics, 2010-2011 (6 issues) 
Krypto the Superdog, DC Comics, 2006-2007 (6 issues)
Legends, DC Comics, 1986 (6 issues)
Legion: Secret Origin, DC Comics, 2012 (6 issues)
Lex Luthor: Man of Steel, DC Comics, 2005 (6 issues)
Lords of the Ultra-Realm, DC Comics, 1986 (6 issues)
The Man of Steel (or Superman: The Man of Steel), DC Comics, 1986 (6 issues)
New Gods (vol. 2), DC Comics, 1984 (6 issues)
The Next, DC Comics, 2006-2007 (6 issues)
The Omega Men, DC Comics, 2006-2007 (6 issues)
The Penguin: Pain and Prejudice, DC Comics, 2011-2012 (5 issues)
Poison Ivy: Cycle of Life and Death, DC Comics, 2016 (6 issues)
Prez, DC Comics, 2015-2016 (6 issue) 
The Question, DC Comics, 2005 (6 issues)
Ragman: Cry of the Dead, DC Comics, 1993-1994 (6 issues)
Ragman (Vol. 3), DC Comics, 2017-2018 (6 issues)
The Ray, DC Comics, 1992 (6 issues) 
Red Tornado (Vol. 2), DC Comics, 2009-2010 (6 issues) 
Robin, DC Comics, 1991 (5 issues) 
Robin III, DC Comics, 1992-1993 (6 issues)
Ronin, DC Comics, 1983-1984 (6 issues) 
Roots of the Swamp Thing, DC Comics, 1986 (5 issues) 
Rush City, DC Comics, 2006-2007 (6 issues)
Secret Six, DC Comics, 2006 (6 issues)
Sgt. Rock: The Prophecy, DC Comics, 2006 (6 issues)
Shadow of the Batman, DC Comics, 1985 (5 issues)
Slash Maraud, DC Comics, 1987-88 (6 issues)
Son of Ambush Bug, DC Comics, 1986 (6 issues)
Son of Vulcan, DC Comics, 2005 (6 issues)
Space Ghost, DC Comics, 2005 (6 issues)
Spanner's Galaxy, DC Comics, 1984-1985 (6 issues)
Star Trek: The Next Generation, DC Comics, 1988 (6 issues)
Supergirl: Cosmic Adventures in the Eighth Grade, 2009 (6 issues)
Superman/Supergirl: Maelstrom, 2008–09 (5 issues)
Super Powers (Vol. 1) DC Comics, 1984 (5 issues)
Super Powers (Vol. 2), DC Comics, 1985-1986 (6 issues)
Super Powers (Vol. 3), DC Comics, 1986 (6 issues)
Tailgunner Jo, DC Comics, 1988-1989 (6 issues)
Time Masters: Vanishing Point, DC Comics, 2010-2011 (6 issues)
Vigilante, DC Comics, 2005–2006 (6 issues)
Who's Who: Update '87, DC Comics, 1987 (5 issues)
Wonder Girl, DC Comics, 2007-2008 (6 issues)
World Without End, DC Comics, 1990-1991 (6 issues)

Elseworlds imprint
Batman: Nevermore, DC Comics (Elseworlds), 2003 (5 issues)
JSA, The Liberty Files: The Whistling Skull, DC Comics (Elseworlds), 2013 (6 issues)
Kamandi: At Earth's End, DC Comics (Elseworlds), 1993 (6 issues)

Johnny DC imprint
Krypto the Superdog, DC Comics (Johnny DC), 2006 (6 issues)

Vertigo imprint
Jonah Hex: Riders of the Worm and Such, DC Comics (Vertigo), 1995 (5 issues)
Jonah Hex: Two-Gun Mojo, DC Comics (Vertigo), 1993 (5 issues)
John Constantine-Hellblazer Special: Papa Midnight, DC Comics (Vertigo), 2005 (5 issues)
Sandman: Overture, DC Comics (Vertigo), 2015-2016 (6 issues)

Wildstorm imprint
Albion, DC Comics (Wildstorm), 2005–2006 (6 issues)
Arrowsmith, DC Comics (Wildstorm/Cliffhanger), 2003 (6 issues)
City of Tomorrow, DC Comics (Wildstorm), 2005 (6 issues)
Jenny Sparks: The Secret History of the Authority, DC Comics (Wildstorm), 2000 (5 issues)
The League of Extraordinary Gentlemen, DC Comics (Wildstorm), 1998-1999 (6 issues)
The League of Extraordinary Gentlemen II, DC Comics (Wildstorm), 2003-2004 (6 issues)
Robotech: Prelude to the Shadow Chronicles, DC Comics (Wildstorm), 2005–2006 (5 issues)
Team Zero, DC Comics (Wildstorm), 2005–2006 (6 issues)
Thunderbolt Jaxon, DC Comics (Wildstorm), 2006 (5 issues)
Greyshirt: Indigo Sunset, DC Comics (Wildstorm), 2001-2002 (6 issues)
Wraithborn, DC Comics (Wildstorm), 2005–2006 (6 issues)

Young Animals imprint
Bug!: The Adventures of Forager, DC Comics (DC Young Animals), 2017-2018 (6 issues)

Published by Image Comics
Alpha Girl, Image Comics, 2012 (5 issues)

Published by Marvel Comics
1602: New World, Marvel Comics, 2005 (5 issues)
Ares, 2006
Astonishing Thor, 2011 (5 issues)
Beyond!, Marvel Comics, 2006 (6 issues)
Battle Scars, Marvel Comics, 2011-2012 (6 issues)
Captain Marvel, Marvel Comics, 1995-1996 (6 issues)
Contest of Champions II, Marvel Comics, 1999 (5 issues)
Daredevil: The Man Without Fear, Marvel Comics, 1993-1994 (5 issues)
Daredevil: Yellow, Marvel Comics, 2001-2002 (6 issues)
Daredevil: Father, Marvel Comics, 2004-2006 (5 issues)
Daredevil: Redemption, Marvel Comics, 2005-2005 (6 issues)
Dark Reign: Elektra, Marvel Comics, 2009 (5 issues)
Dark Reign: Fantastic Four, Marvel Comics, 2009 (5 issues)
Dark Reign: Hawkeye, Marvel Comics, 2009 (5 issues)
Fantastic Four: The End, Marvel Comics, 2006-2007 (6 issues)
Hulk: Grey, Marvel Comics, 2002 (6 issues)
Hulk Smash Avengers, 2012 (5 issues)
Infinity Abyss, Marvel Comics, 2002 (6 issues)
Infinity Crusade, Marvel Comics, 1993 (6 issues)
The Infinity Gauntlet, Marvel Comics, 1990 (6 issues)
Infinity War, Marvel Comics, 1992 (6 issues)
Kitty Pryde and Wolverine, Marvel Comics, 1984-1985 (6 issues)
Longshot, Marvel Comics, 1985 (6 issues)
The Punisher, Marvel Comics, 1986 (5 issues)
Punisher vs. Bullseye, Marvel Comics, year unknown (5 issues)
Spellbinders, Marvel Comics, 1988 (6 issues)
Spider-Man: Blue, Marvel Comics, 2002 (6 issues)
Spider-Man: Get Kraven, Marvel Comics, 2002 (6 issues)
Spider-Man: Breakout, Marvel Comics, 2005 (5 issues)
Spider-Man: House of M, Marvel Comics, 2005 (5 issues)
Spider-Man: The Arachnis Project, Marvel Comics, 1993 (6 issues)
Spider-Man/Black Cat: The Evil That Men Do, Marvel Comics, 2002-2006 (6 issues)
Spider-Man/Red Sonja, Marvel Comics, 2007-2008 (5 issues)
Venom: Sinner Takes All, Marvel Comics, 1995 (5 issues)
World War Hulk, Marvel Comics, 2007 (5 issues)
Spider-Men, Marvel Comics, 2012 (5 issues)
Star Wars: Chewbacca, Marvel Comics, 2015 (5 issues)
Star Wars: Darth Maul, Marvel Comics, 2017 (5 issues)
Star Wars: Han Solo, Marvel Comics, 2016 (5 issues)
Star Wars: Jedi of the Republic – Mace Windu, Marvel Comics, 2017 (5 issues)
Star Wars: Lando, Marvel Comics, 2015 (5 issues)
Star Wars: Obi-Wan and Anakin, Marvel Comics, 2016 (5 issues)
Star Wars: Princess Leia, Marvel Comics, 2015 (5 issues)
Star Wars: Rogue One Adaptation, Marvel Comics, 2017 (6 issues)
Star Wars: The Force Awakens Adaptation, Marvel Comics, 2016 (6 issues)
Star Wars: Thrawn, Marvel Comics, 2018 (6 issues)

Marvel Knights
Wolverine/Punisher, Marvel Comics (Marvel Knights), year unknown (5 issues)
Daredevil vs. The Punisher: Means and Ends, Marvel Comics (Marvel Knights), year unknown (6 issues)
Ghost Rider, Marvel Comics (Marvel Knights), 2005-2006 (6 issues)

MAX imprint
Doctor Spectrum: Full Spectrum, Marvel Comics (MAX Imprint), 2004-2005 (6 issues)
Supreme Power: Hyperion, Marvel Comics (MAX Imprint), 2005–2006 (5 issues)
Supreme Power: Nighthawk, Marvel Comics (MAX Imprint), 2005–2006 (6 issues)

Ultimate imprint
Ultimate Nightmare, Marvel Comics, 2004 (5 issues)
Ultimate Extinction, Marvel Comics, 2006 (5 issues)

Epic imprint
The One, Marvel Comics (Epic Comics), 1983 (6 issues)
Steelgrip Starkey, Marvel Comics (Epic Comics), 1986 (6 issues)
Trouble, Marvel Comics (Epic Comics), 2003 (5 issues)

Other publishers
Harley & Ivy Meet Betty & Veronica, DC Comics and Archie Comics, 2017–18 (6 issues)
Mouse Guard: Fall 1152 (a.k.a. Series 1), Archaia Studios Press, 2006-2007 (6 issues)
Star Trek: Assignment Earth, IDW Publishing, 2008
Star Trek: Mirror Images, IDW Publishing, 2008
Star Trek: New Frontier, IDW Publishing, 2008
Star Trek: The Next Generation: Intelligence Gathering, IDW Publishing, 2008
Star Trek: The Next Generation: The Last Generation, IDW Publishing, 2008–09
Scott Pilgrim
Bloodthirsty: One Nation Under Water, Titan Comics, 2015–16

Seven to nine issues

Published by DC Comics
Note: (MS) designates that the limited series was identified by DC Comics as a "maxiseries" at publication.
Adam Strange, DC Comics, 2004-2005 (8 issues)
The Atlantis Chronicles, DC Comics, 1990 (7 issues) 
Batman: City of Light, DC Comics, 2003-2004 (8 issues)
Batman: Death and the Maidens, DC Comics, 2003-2004 (9 issues)
Batman Family, DC Comics, 2002-2003 (8 issues)
Black Adam: The Dark Age, DC Comics, 2007-2008 (8 issues)
Blackest Night, DC Comics, 2009-2010 (8 issues)
Challengers of the Unknown, DC Comics, 1991 (8 issues)
Convergence, DC Comics, 2015 (9 issues)
Countdown to Adventure, DC Comics, 2007-2008 (8 issues)
Countdown to Mystery, DC Comics, 2007-2008 (8 issues)
The Dark Knight III: The Master Race, DC Comics, 2015–2017 (9 issues)
Deadman, DC Comics, 1985 (7 issues)
Final Crisis, DC Comics, 2008 (7 issues)
Flash Gordon, DC Comics, 1988 (9 issues)
The Human Race, DC Comics, 2005–2006 (7 issues)
The Great Ten, DC Comics, 2010 (9 issues)
Green Lantern/Green Arrow, DC Comics, 1983-1984 (7 issues)
Hammer Locke, DC Comics, 1991-1992 (9 issues)
Identity Crisis, DC Comics, 2005–2006 (7 issues)
Infinite Crisis, DC Comics, 2005–2006 (7 issues)
Justice Society of America, DC Comics, 1991 (8 issues)
Millennium, DC Comics, 1988 (8 issues)
Martian Manhunter, DC Comics, 2006-2007 (8 issues)
Metal Men, DC Comics, 2007-2008 (8 issues)
Night Force (Vol. 2), DC Comics, 2017 (7 issues)
OMAC, DC Comics, 2006-2007 (8 issues)
Outlaws, DC Comics, 1991-1992 (8 issues)
Ragman (vol. 2), DC Comics, 1991-1992 (8 issues)
Suicide Squad: Raise the Flag, DC Comics, 2007-2008 (8 issues)
Terminal City, DC Comics, 1996 (9 issues)
Time Masters, DC Comics, 1990 (8 issues)
Uncle Sam & The Freedom Fighters, DC Comics, 2006-2007 (8 issues)
Who's Who in the Legion of Super-Heroes, DC Comics, 1988 (7 issues)

Wildstorm imprint
The American Way, DC Comics (Wildstorm), 2006 (8 issues)
Captain Atom: Armageddon, DC Comics (Wildstorm), 2005-2006 (9 issues)
Wildcats: Nemesis, DC Comics (Wildstorm), 2005-2006 (9 issues)
The Winter Men, DC Comics (Wildstorm), 2005-2006 (8 issues)

Vertigo imprint
Neil Gaiman's Neverwhere, DC Comics (Vertigo), 2005-2006 (9 issues)
The New Deadwardians, Vertigo 2012 (8 issues)

Published by Marvel Comics
Avengers: The Children's Crusade, Marvel Comics, 2010-2011 (9 issues)
1602, Marvel Comics, 2003 (8 issues)
Civil War, Marvel Comics, 2006-2007 (7 issues)
The Dark Tower: The Gunslinger Born, Marvel Comics, 2007 (7 issues)
Elektra: Assassin, Marvel Comics, 1986-1987 (8 issues)
House of M, Marvel Comics, 2005 (8 issues)
Secret Invasion, Marvel Comics, 2008 (8 issues)
Secret Wars II, Marvel Comics, 1985-1986 (9 issues)
Spider-Man Team-Up, Marvel Comics, 1995-97 (7 issues)
The Marvels Project, Marvel Comics, 2009-2010 (8 issues)

Ultimate imprint
Ultimate Six, Marvel Comics, 2003-2004 (7 issues)
Ultimate Power,  Marvel Comics, 2006 (9 issues)

Other publishers
Nagayana, Raj Comics, 2007-2009 (8 issues)
Red Rocket 7, Dark Horse Comics, 1998 (7 issues)
Space Battle Lunchtime, Oni Press, 2016 (8 issues)

Ten to eleven issues

Published by DC Comics
Superman & Batman: World's Finest, DC Comics, 1999 (10 issues)
V for Vendetta, DC Comics, 1988-1989 (10 issues)

Published by Marvel Comics
Star Wars: Age of Republic, Marvel Comics, 2018-2019 (10 issues)

Other publishers
From Hell (various publishers), 1991-1996 (10 issues)

Twelve (12) issues

Published by DC Comics
Note: (MS) designates that the limited series was identified by DC Comics as a "maxi-series" at publication.
Amethyst, Princess of Gemworld, DC Comics, 1983-1984 (MS)
Batman: Journey Into Night, DC Comics, 2005-2006
Camelot 3000, DC Comics, 1982-1985 (MS)
Crisis on Infinite Earths, DC Comics, 1985-1986 (MS)
DC Challenge, DC Comics, 1985-1986 (MS)
Doomsday Clock, DC Comics, 2017-2019
Kamandi Challenge, DC Comics, 2017-2018
Ion, DC Comics, 2006-2007
Jemm Son of Saturn, DC Comics, 1984-1985 (MS)
Justice, DC Comics, 2005-2006
Justice League Elite, DC Comics, 2004-2005
Legion Lost, DC Comics, 2000-2001
Mister Miracle (Vol. 4), DC Comics, 2017-2018
The Omega Men: The End is Here, DC Comics, 2015-2016
Outcasts (DC Comics), DC Comics, 1987-1988
The Shade (Vol. 2), DC Comics, 2011-2012
Showcase '94, DC Comics, 1994
Silverblade, DC Comics, 1987 (MS)
Sun Devils, DC Comics, 1984-1985 (MS)
Superman & Batman: Generations III, DC Comics, 2003
Superman: Birthright, DC Comics, 2003
The Trials of Shazam!, DC Comics, 2006-2007
Unknown Soldier (vol. 2), DC Comics, 1988-1989
Watchmen, DC Comics, 1986-1987 (12 issues)

Wildstorm Imprint
Global Frequency, DC Comics (Wildstorm), 2002-2004

Published by Marvel Comics
Avengers Forever, Marvel Comics, 1998-2000
Eternals vol. 2, Marvel Comics, 1985-1986
Foolkiller, Marvel Comics, 1990-1991
Marvel: The Lost Generation, Marvel Comics, 2000-2002
Secret Wars, Marvel Comics, 1984-1985
Spider-Man: Chapter One, Marvel Comics, 1999
Squadron Supreme, Marvel Comics, 1985-1986
The Vision vol. 2, Marvel Comics, 2015-2016
Vision and the Scarlet Witch vol. 2, Marvel Comics, 1985-1986

Other publishers
Demo, AiT/Planet Lar, 2003-2004
Midnight Nation, Top Cow (Joe's Comics imprint), 2000-2002

More than twelve issues
The following list consists of limited series which are longer than 12 issues. However, this list does not include ongoing or continuous series which have come to an end due to cancellation, nor those series which may have had an end determined by their creators, but for which a pre-determined issue number was not announced prior to the publication of the first issue.

Published by DC Comics
52, DC Comics, May 2006 – May 2007 (52 issues)
Batman: The Long Halloween, DC Comics, December 1996 - December 1997  (13 issues)
Batman: Dark Victory, DC Comics, November 1999 - December 2000 (14 issues)
Batman: Legacy, DC Comics, August 1996 - October 1996 (15 issues)
Brightest Day, DC Comics, May 2010 – May 2011 (26 issues)
Countdown, DC Comics, May 2007 - April 2008 (51 issues)
The Filth, Vertigo/DC Comics, August 2002 - October 2003 (13 issues)
Justice League: Generation Lost, DC Comics, July 2010 – April 2011 (26 issues)
The New 52: Futures End, DC Comics, May 2014 - June 2015 (49 issues)
Seven Soldiers, April 2005 – December 2006 DC Comics (30 issues)
Who's Who: The Definitive Directory of the DC Universe, DC Comics, March 1985 - April 1987 (26 issues)

Published by Marvel Comics
 Earth X - 14 issues, Marvel Comics, 1999-2000

Other publishers
Mage: The Hero Discovered, 1984-1986, Comico (15 issues)
Mage: The Hero Defined, 1998-1999, Image Comics (15 issues)
Rising Stars, Top Cow (Joe's Comics imprint), 1999-2005 (24 issues)
Cerebus the Aardvark, Aardvark-Vanaheim, 1977-2004 (300 issues)
Bone, Cartoon Books, 1991-2004 (55 issues)
RASL, Cartoon Books, 2008-2012 (15 issues)

Unsorted/insufficient data
 John Jakes' Mullkon Empire (6 issues) - Tekno Comix
 Neil Gaiman's Phage: Shadow Death (6-issues) - Tekno Comix
 Deadpool: Sins of the Past - Marvel Comics

See also
List of X-Men limited series
Spider-Man limited series

References

Limited series